BCP may refer to:

Organisations
 , a battalion of French light infantry
 Bellarmine College Preparatory, a Jesuit college preparatory in San Jose, California
 Basutoland Congress Party, a Pan-Africanist and left-wing political party in Lesotho
 Bulgarian Communist Party, the communist and Marxist–Leninist ruling party of Bulgaria from 1946 until 1990 when the country ceased to be a communist state
 Brophy College Preparatory, a Jesuit college preparatory in Phoenix, Arizona

Business
 , a Moroccan bank
 Portuguese Commercial Bank (a Portuguese bank, operating under the Millennium bcp brand
 , a Bolivian bank
 , a Peruvian bank
 Better Choice Parking, a UK airport car parking company
 , a former mobile phone company, now part of 
 Business continuity planning, a process of corporate threat-modelling and ensuring corporate survival

Science and technology
 Benocyclidine, a psychoactive drug and research chemical of the arylcyclohexylamine class
 Best Current Practice, a numbered subset of the RFCs published by the Internet Engineering Task Force
 Birth control pill, the combined oral contraceptive pill
 Bromochloropropane, a chemical used in RNA and DNA isolation; see acid guanidinium thiocyanate-phenol-chloroform extraction
 Bromocresol purple, a pH indicator
 Bathocuproine, a chemical reagent used in a quantum dot display
 Best current practice, a standard-like de facto, dynamic level of performance in engineering and information technology
 Bulk Copy Program, a command-line tool used to import data to or export data from various database software
 β-caryophyllene, a chemical

Other
 Border control post
  (EYD: Basuki Cahaya Purnama; born 1966), an Indonesian politician also known by his Hakka Chinese nickname Ahok
 Book of Common Prayer, the short title of a number of related Anglican prayer books
 Boston cream pie, a round cake that is split and filled with a custard or cream filling and frosted with chocolate
 Independent Republican Party (Turkey) (a political party in Turkey
 Bournemouth, Christchurch and Poole Council, a local government area in England 
 Blueprint Culture and Creative Park, an event venue in Tainan, Taiwan
 The Booster Course Pass, an expansion to the video game Mario Kart 8 Deluxe